Kamen is a German town.

Kamen may also refer to:

People
Kamen Ringu, Indian politician
Hannah John-Kamen, actress
Dean Kamen, inventor
Henry Kamen, historian
Jack Kamen, illustrator
Kay Kamen, merchandising executive
Kuishinbo Kamen, wrestler
Marina Kamen, musician
Martin Kamen, chemist
Michael Kamen, composer
Milt Kamen, stand-up comic
Nick Kamen, songwriter and model
Rebecca Kamen, artist
Robert Mark Kamen, screenwriter

Places
Kamen, Glamoč, a village in Bosnia and Herzegovina
Kamen (Goražde), a village in Bosnia and Herzegovina
Kamen, Croatia, a settlement near Split, Croatia
Kámen (Pelhřimov District), a village in the Czech Republic
Kamen-na-Obi, a Russian town
Bolshoy Kamen, a Russian town
Kamen, Alexandrovsky District, Perm Krai, a settlement in Perm Krai, Russia
Kamen, a volcano in Russia

Japanese media
In Japan, the word kamen means mask.

Kamen Rider, television series
Kamen Rider (franchise), television and film metaseries
Kamen no Ninja Akakage (Masked Ninja Red Shadow), television series
Moonlight Mask (Gekko Kamen), superhero in television and film
Tuxedo Kamen, protagonist in the animation series Sailor Moon
Kekko Kamen, Japanese manga series
Hentai Kamen (Masked Pervert), manga series

Other
"Kamen" (song), by Kumi Koda
Kamen (surname)
Kamen (volcano), volcano
NK Kamen Ingrad, football club
South Slavic word for stone
Mount Kamen

See also
Kámen (disambiguation)
Kamin (disambiguation)